Daniel Island is a peninsular in South Carolina, United States.

Daniel Island may also refer to:

 Daniel Island, Bermuda
 Daniel Island (Nunavut), in Canada
 Daniel Island, Antarctica